Mulher na Montanha (Portuguese for "Woman on the Mountain") is the third studio album by Brazilian psychedelic rock band Violeta de Outono. The band began work on the album in 1995, and was only recorded as demos that circulated among the fans during the 90's. These demos wouldn't be released until September 27, 1999 by Voiceprint Records, being their first of many albums to be so. It was also their first album of new material since 1989's Em Toda Parte.

The track "Terra Distante" previously appeared in Em Toda Parte, and was re-recorded for this release.

According to Fabio Golfetti, the lyrics to "Sonho" were based on a poem by Chinese poet Li Bai.

Voiceprint re-issued Mulher na Montanha in 2003, containing three bonus tracks – re-recorded versions of two tracks which previously appeared in their 1986 EP Reflexos da Noite and a cover of Pink Floyd's "Astronomy Domine".

Track listing

Personnel
 Fabio Golfetti – vocals, guitar
 Cláudio Souza – drums
 Angelo Pastorello – bass

References

External links
 Mulher na Montanha at Violeta de Outono's official Bandcamp

1999 albums
Voiceprint Records albums
Violeta de Outono albums
Portuguese-language albums